Patrick Sercu (27 June 1944 – 19 April 2019) was a Belgian cyclist who was active on the road and track between 1961 and 1983. On track, he won the gold medal in the 1 km time trial at the 1964 Summer Olympics, as well as three world titles in the sprint in 1963, 1967 and 1969. On the road, he earned the green jersey in the 1974 Tour de France. Sercu is the record holder for the number of six-day track race victories, having won 88 events out of 223 starts between 1961 and 1983; several of these wins were with cycling great Eddy Merckx. He also won six stages at the Tour de France and eleven stages at the Giro d'Italia.

With 38 national and 15 European championship titles, he is considered as one of the most successful track cyclists ever.

In total, he won no less than 1,206 races, of which 168 road races and 1,038 track races.

Biography

Early life 
At a young age, Patrick Sercu was pushed towards the track by his father Albert, himself a successful rider. "He was afraid I would break down too quickly on the road", Patrick Sercu himself said about that.

With his fast legs, Sercu was also born for explosive work on the track. In 1962, aged 18, he won his first national titles, in the sprint and madison events. At 19, Sercu became world amateur sprint champion in Rocourt, near Liège.

A year later, the still very young Sercu captured gold at the kilometre in Tokyo, his only participation in the Games as only amateurs were allowed to compete in the cycling events at the time. That year, he was the star attraction at the Manchester Wheelers' Club Race Meet at the Fallowfield track in Manchester.

Professional career 
After the Olympics, professional life and also increasingly the road races beckoned for Sercu. Super team Solo–Superia, which also included Eddy Merckx, Rik Van Looy and Rik Van Steenbergen, brought in the West-Fleming.

While on the road he still lacked power and speed, on the track he was increasingly successful. Between 1965 and 1969, he won two more golds and two more silver medals at the World Sprint Championships, each time after a duel with his Italian rival Giuseppe Beghetto.

He was also an instant winner in the Six Days. With Eddy Merckx at his side, he won his first of 11 Six Days in Ghent in 1965. Until the early 1980s, Sercu would remain the uncrowned king of the Six Days.

With 88 final victories, Sercu leads the eternal rankings. "It's Merckx's fault there weren't more", he later said jokingly. After all, Merckx could not ride a full winter programme due to his busy schedule.

Gradually, Sercu began to find his feet on the road as well. In 1970, he rode his first major tour, the Giro, and took his first stage win. Twelve more stage wins in the Italian Tour would follow in the following years.

By the mid-1970s, Sercu had become one of the most renowned sprinters in the peloton. In his first participation in the Tour at the age of 30, he snatched 3 stages as well as the green jersey. Three years later, he would bring his total in the Tour to six stage wins. By then, he had already won the overall classification of another stage race Giro di Sardegna in 1970, and the points classification of the Critérium du Dauphiné and La Méditerranée in 1977.

Retirement 

Patrick Sercu retired from competitions in 1983. He became organizer of six days events and omniums all over the world, and director of the Six Days of Ghent and the former Six Days of Hasselt. After a few years with unstable health, Sercu died on 19 April 2019, aged 74.

Major results

Road

1964
1st Gent–Wevelgem Amateur race
1965
1st Criterium Zolder
1966
1st Criterium Bourcefranc
1967
1st Memorial Tom Simpson
1968
1st Omloop van Midden-Vlaanderen
2nd Ronde van Limburg
1969
 1st Omloop Leiedal
 1st Stage 5 Tirreno–Adriatico
3rd Omloop der Vlaamse Gewesten
1970
 Giro d'Italia
1st Stage 5
2nd Coppa Sabatini
2nd Milano–Vignola
2nd GP Bruno Beghelli
2nd Giro di Calabria
2nd Nokere Koerse
3rd Giro della Provincia di Reggio Calabria
 3th Overall Tirreno–Adriatico
 1st Stage 5
 1st  Overall Giro di Sardegna
1st Stage 4
1971
1st Izegem koers
 Giro d'Italia
1st Stages 13 & 14
1st Stage 2 Giro di Sardegna
1st Criterium Tortoretto
2nd Coppa Bernocchi
 1st Stage 1 Tour de Romandie
 1st GP Roeselare
2nd Grote 1-MeiPrijs
2nd Milano–Vignola
2nd GP Bruno Beghelli
2nd Giro di Campania
3rd Sassari-Cagliari
1972
 1st Omloop van het Houtland
 1st Kampioenschap van Vlaanderen
 1st Criterium Lignano
2nd Coppa Bernocchi
2nd Paris–Camembert
1st Stage 3 Tirreno–Adriatico
 3rd Overall Giro di Sardegna
1st Stage 6
3rd Sassari-Cagliari
1973
1st Maaslandse Pijl
 Giro d'Italia
1st Stage 9
1st Stage 2 Giro di Puglia
1st Elfstedenronde
1st Classica Sarda
1st Sassari-Cagliari
2nd Milano–Vignola
2nd GP Bruno Beghelli

1974
 Tour de France
1st  Points classification
1st StageS 3, 4 and 10
1st Halle–Ingooigem
 Giro d'Italia
1st Stages 1, 10 & 12 (ITT), 7 & 15 (ITT)
1st De Kustpijl
1st Dwars door West-Vlaanderen
1st Criterium Rouergue
2nd Giro di Sicilia
2nd Omloop Het Nieuwsblad
5th Overall Giro di Sardegna
1st Stages 2, 3 and 5
1975
1st Izegem Koers
1st Circuit of Dunkirk
 Giro d'Italia
1st Stages 2, 13 and 18
 Tour de Romandie
1st Stages 2 and 5
Tirreno–Adriatico
1st Stage 4
1st Dwars door West-Vlaanderen
1st Stage 3 Giro di Sardegna
2nd Omloop Het Nieuwsblad
2nd GP Bruno Beghelli
2nd Milano–Vignola
2nd :fr:Grand Prix Cemab
1976
 Giro d'Italia
1st Stages 1, 2 and 11
1st Stage 4 Giro di Puglia
1st Stage 5 Giro di Sardegna
1st Criterium Nantes
3rd Omloop Het Nieuwsblad
1977
 1st Tour de France
1st Stages 8, 9 (TTT), 14 and 15
 Critérium du Dauphiné Libéré
1st  Points classification
1st Stages 3, 4, 5 and 8
Paris–Nice
1st Stages 8 and 10
1st Kuurne–Brussels–Kuurne
3rd Overall Giro di Sardegna
1st Stages 2 and 3
La Méditerranéenne
1st  Points classification
1st Stages 4 and 5
2nd E3 Harelbeke
1978
1st Stage 2 Tour of Belgium
1st Omloop van de Grensstreek
1st Criterium Hank
1979
1st GP Union Dortmund
1st Stage 6 Deutschland Tour
1980
1st Omloop van het Zuidwesten
1st Criterium Mol

Track 

1962
Belgian National Championships
1st  Amateur Sprint
1963
1st  Men's Amateur sprint, UCI Track World Championships
Belgian National Championships
1st  Amateur Madison (with Romain De Loof)
1st  Amateur Sprint
1st  Amateur Omnium
1st Brussels Omnium (with Eddy Merckx)
1st Roucourt Sprint
1964
 Summer Olympics
1st  Men's track time trial
  World Record Flying 500 m time trial amateurs (29"66)
  World Record 1 km time trial amateurs (1'06"76)
Belgian National Championships 
1st  Amateur Madison (with Eddy Merckx)
1st  Amateur Sprint
1st  Amateur Omnium
1st Brussels Omnium (with Eddy Merckx)
1st Cologne Omnium (with Eddy Merckx)
1st Antwerp Omnium (with Eddy Merckx)
1st Forest-Vorst Omnium (with Eddy Merckx)
1965
1st  European Track Championships – Omnium
Belgian National Championships 
1st  Omnium
1st  Amateur Madison (with Eddy Merckx)
1st  Sprint
2nd  Men's sprint, UCI Track World Championships
1st Six Days of Ghent (with Eddy Merckx)
2nd Six Days of Brussels (with Eddy Merckx)
3rd Six Days of Antwerp (with Emile Severeyns and Theo Verschueren)
1966
Belgian National Championships
1st  Omnium
1st  Madison (with Eddy Merckx)
1st Six Days of Frankfurt (with Klaus Bugdahl)
1st Antwerp Omnium (with Eddy Merckx
1st Rocourt Omnium (with Eddy Merckx
1st Ostend Omnium (with Eddy Merckx
1st Brussels Omnium (with Eddy Merckx
1st Ghent Omnium (with Eddy Merckx, Rik Van Steenbergen and Noël Van Clooster
2nd Six Days of Ghent (with Klaus Bugdahl)
2nd Six Days of Antwerp (with Eddy Merckx and Klaus Bugdahl)
3rd Six Days of Milan (with Leandro Faggin)
3rd Six Days of Zürich (with Klaus Bugdahl)
3rd Six Days of Amsterdam (with Jan Janssen)
1967
1st  Men's sprint, UCI Track World Championships
1st  European Track Championships – Omnium
  World Indoor Record Flying 1 km time trial (1'01"23)
Belgian National Championships
1st  Omnium
1st  Madison (with Eddy Merckx)
1st  Sprint
2nd  Derny
1st Six Days of Cologne (with Klaus Bugdahl)
1st Six Days of Ghent (with Eddy Merckx)
1st Six Days of Charleroi (with Ferdinand Bracke)
1st Six Days of Montreal I (with Emile Severeyns)
1st Six Days of Münster (with Klaus Bugdahl)
1st Madison Ostend (with Eddy Merckx)
1st Madison Rocourt (with Eddy Merckx)
2nd Six Days of Antwerp (with Eddy Merckx and Klaus Bugdahl)
2nd Six Days of Dortmund (with Klaus Bugdahl)
2nd Six Days of Berlin II (with Eddy Merckx)
2nd Six Days of Zürich (with Klaus Bugdahl)
2nd Six Days of Milan (with Klaus Bugdahl)
3rd Six Days of Berlin I (with Klaus Bugdahl)
3rd Six Days of Bremen (with Klaus Bugdahl)
3rd Six Days of Frankfurt (with Klaus Bugdahl)
3rd Six Days of Montreal II (with Emile Severeyns)
1968
European Track Championships
1st  Omnium
3rd  Madison (with Klaus Bugdahl))
Belgian National Championships 
1st  Omnium
1st  Madison (with Eddy Merckx)
1st  Sprint
1st Six Days of London (with Peter Post)
1st Six Days of Frankfurt (with Rudi Altig)
1st Six Days of Dortmund (with Rudi Altig)
2nd  Men's sprint, UCI Track World Championships
2nd Six Days of Zürich (with Peter Post)
2nd Six Days of Cologne (with Eddy Merckx)
2nd Six Days of Ghent (with Rik Van Looy)
2nd Six Days of Montreal (with Emile Severeyns)
3rd Six Days of Antwerp (with Jan Janssen and Klaus Bugdahl)
3rd Six Days of Charleroi (with Rik Van Looy)
1969
1st  Men's sprint, UCI Track World Championships
European Track Championships
1st  Omnium
1st  Madison (with Peter Post)
Belgian National Championships 
1st  Madison (with Rik Van Looy)
1st  Sprint
1st Six Days of London (with Peter Post)
1st Six Days of Frankfurt (with Peter Post)
1st Six Days of Dortmund (with Peter Post)
1st Six Days of Antwerp (with Rik Van Looy and Peter Post)
1st Six Days of Bremen (with Peter Post)
2nd Six Days of Cologne (with Peter Post)
2nd Six Days of Berlin (with Peter Post)
2nd Six Days of Ghent (with Alain van Lancker)
2nd Six Days of Milan with Eddy Merckx)
2nd Six Days of Montreal (with Emile Severeyns)
3rd Six Days of Zürich (with Alain van Lancker)
1970
European Track Championships
1st  Omnium
1st  Madison (with Eddy Merckx)
Belgian National Championships
1st  Omnium
1st  Madison (with Norbert Seeuws)
1st Six Days of London (with Peter Post)
1st Six Days of Cologne (with Peter Post)
1st Six Days of Bremen (with Peter Post)
1st Six Days of Ghent (with Jean-Pierre Monseré)
2nd Six Days of Berlin (with Albert Fritz)
2nd Six Days of Antwerp (with Romain Deloof and Alain van Lancker)
3rd Six Days of Zürich (with Sigi Renz and Jürgen Schneider)
1971
European Track Championships
1st  Omnium
3rd  Madison (with Graeme Gilmore))
Belgian National Championships
1st  Omnium
1st  Madison (with Jean-Pierre Monseré)
1st Six Days of London (with Peter Post)
1st Six Days of Ghent (with Roger De Vlaeminck)
1st Six Days of Frankfurt (with Peter Post)
1st Six Days of Berlin (with Peter Post)
1st Six Days of Rotterdam (with Peter Post)
2nd Six Days of Bremen (with Peter Post)
2nd Six Days of Brussels (with Roger De Vlaeminck)
3rd Six Days of Dortmund (with Peter Post)
3rd Six Days of Grenoble (with Ferdinand Bracke)
1972
European Track Championships
1st  Omnium
2nd  Madison (with Julien Stevens))
  World Record 1 km time trial (1'07"35)
Belgian National Championships
1st  Omnium
1st  Madison (with Roger De Vlaeminck)
1st Six Days of London (with Tony Gowland)
1st Six Days of Ghent (with Julien Stevens)
1st Six Days of Dortmund (with Alain van Lancker)
2nd Six Days of Antwerp (with Rik Van Linden and Alain van Lancker)
2nd Six Days of Milan with Gianni Motta)
2nd Six Days of Bremen (with Peter Post)
3rd Six Days of Munich (with Alain van Lancker)
1973
European Track Championships
1st  Omnium
  World Outdoor Record Flying 1 km time trial (1' 02" 40)
Belgian National Championships
1st  Madison (with Julien Stevens)
1st Six Days of Cologne (with Alain van Lancker)
1st Six Days of Dortmund (with Eddy Merckx)
1st Six Days of Milan with Julien Stevens)
1st Six Days of Ghent (with Graeme Gilmore)
1st Six Days of Grenoble (with Eddy Merckx)
2nd Six Days of London (with Gianni Motta )
2nd Six Days of Rotterdam (with Eddy Merckx)
1974
Belgian National Championships
1st  Omnium
1st  Madison (with Eddy Merckx)
1st Six Days of London (with René Pijnen)
1st Six Days of Dortmund (with René Pijnen)
1st Six Days of Antwerp (with Eddy Merckx)
2nd Six Days of Cologne (with Wilfried Peffgen)
2nd Six Days of Ghent (with Sigi Renz)
2nd Six Days of Rotterdam (with Eddy Merckx)
3rd Six Days of Bremen (with Graeme Gilmore)
3rd Six Days of Grenoble (with René Pijnen)
1975
European Track Championships
1st  Madison (with René Pijnen)
Belgian National Championships
1st  Omnium
1st  Madison (with Eddy Merckx)
1st Six Days of Zürich (with Günther Haritz)
1st Six Days of Berlin (with Dietrich Thurau)
1st Six Days of Bremen (with René Pijnen)
1st Six Days of Ghent (with Eddy Merckx)
1st Six Days of Antwerp (with Eddy Merckx)
1st Six Days of Grenoble (with Eddy Merckx)
2nd Six Days of Dortmund (with Eddy Merckx)
2nd Six Days of Frankfurt (with Dietrich Thurau)
2nd Six Days of Munich (with Eddy Merckx)
3rd Six Days of London (with Alain van Lancker)
3rd Six Days of Rotterdam (with Alain van Lancker)
1976
European Track Championships
1st  Omnium
3rd  Madison (with Klaus Bugdahl))
Belgian National Championships
1st  Omnium
1st  Madison (with Eddy Merckx)
1st  Derny
1st Six Days of Milan with Francesco Moser)
1st Six Days of Antwerp (with Eddy Merckx)
1st Six Days of Dortmund (with Freddy Maertens)
1st Six Days of Rotterdam (with Eddy Merckx)
1st Six Days of Maastricht (with Graeme Gilmore)
2nd Six Days of Berlin (with René Pijnen)
2nd Six Days of Munich (with Graeme Gilmore)
2nd Six Days of Ghent (with Ferdi Van Den Haute)
3rd Six Days of Bremen (with Graeme Gilmore)
3rd Six Days of Grenoble (with Felice Gimondi)
1977
European Track Championships
1st  Omnium
1st  Madison (with Eddy Merckx)
1st  Derny
Belgian National Championships
1st  Omnium
1st  Madison (with Ferdi Van Den Haute)
1st Six Days of Zürich (with Eddy Merckx)
1st Six Days of Antwerp (with Freddy Maertens)
1st Six Days of Ghent (with Eddy Merckx)
1st Six Days of London (with René Pijnen)
1st Six Days of Berlin (with Eddy Merckx)
1st Six Days of Munich (with Eddy Merckx)
1st Six Days of Maastricht (with Eddy Merckx)
2nd Six Days of Grenoble (with Eddy Merckx)
3rd Six Days of Dortmund (with Wilfried Peffgen)
3rd Six Days of Frankfurt (with Klaus Bugdahl)
3rd Six Days of Rotterdam (with Freddy Maertens)
3rd Six Days of Herning (with Ole Ritter)
1978
European Track Championships
1st  Madison (with Gregor Braun)
2nd  Derny
Belgian National Championships
1st  Omnium
1st Six Days of Ghent (with Gerrie Knetemann)
1st Six Days of Frankfurt (with Dietrich Thurau)
1st Six Days of Berlin (with Dietrich Thurau)
1st Six Days of Munich (with Gregor Braun)
1st Six Days of Grenoble (with Dietrich Thurau)
2nd Six Days of Milan with Giuseppe Saronni)
3rd Six Days of Dortmund (with Dietrich Thurau)
3rd Six Days of Herning (with Niels Fredborg)
1979
European Track Championships
2nd  Omnium
3rd  Madison (with Dietrich Thurau)
Belgian National Championships
1st  Omnium
1st Six Days of London (with Albert Fritz)
1st Six Days of Zürich (with Albert Fritz)
1st Six Days of Cologne (with Gregor Braun)
1st Six Days of Dortmund (with Dietrich Thurau)
1st Six Days of Berlin (with Dietrich Thurau)
1st Six Days of Munich (with Dietrich Thurau)
1st Six Days of Rotterdam (with Albert Fritz)
2nd Six Days of Frankfurt (with Dietrich Thurau)
2nd Six Days of Ghent (with Stan Tourné)
2nd Six Days of Groningen (with Albert Fritz)
3rd Six Days of Milan with Felice Gimondi)
3rd Six Days of Bremen (with Dietrich Thurau)
3rd Six Days of Antwerp (with Roger De Vlaeminck and Rik Van Linden)
3rd Six Days of Grenoble (with Bernard Vallet)
3rd Six Days of Maastricht (with Albert Fritz)
1980
European Track Championships
1st  Omnium
2nd  Derny
1st Six Days of Milan with Giuseppe Saronni)
1st Six Days of Dortmund (with Gregor Braun)
1st Six Days of Berlin (with Gregor Braun)
1st Six Days of Bremen (with Albert Fritz)
1st Six Days of Ghent (with Albert Fritz)
1st Six Days of Herning (with Gert Frank)
2nd Six Days of Maastricht (with Albert Fritz)
3rd Six Days of Rotterdam (with Albert Fritz)
3rd Six Days of London (with Albert Fritz)
3rd Six Days of Cologne (with Albert Fritz)
1981
European Track Championships
3rd  Omnium
Belgian National Championships
2nd  Points race
1st Six Days of Milan with Francesco Moser)
1st Six Days of Cologne (with Albert Fritz)
1st Six Days of Ghent (with Gert Frank)
1st Six Days of Grenoble (with Urs Freuler)
2nd Six Days of Bremen (with Albert Fritz)
3rd Six Days of Zürich (with René Pijnen)
3rd Six Days of Rotterdam (with Albert Fritz)
1982
European Track Championships
1st  Madison (with René Pijnen)
3rd  Omnium 
Belgian National Championships
1st  Omnium
1st Six Days of Antwerp (with Roger De Vlaeminck)
1st Six Days of Berlin (with Maurizio Bidinost)
1st Six Days of Rotterdam (with René Pijnen)
2nd Six Days of Milan with Francesco Moser)
2nd Six Days of Cologne (with Gregor Braun)
2nd Six Days of Bremen (with Gert Frank)
2nd Six Days of Zürich (with Danny Clark)
2nd Six Days of Herning (with René Pijnen)
3rd Six Days of Ghent (with Roger De Vlaeminck)
3rd Six Days of Maastricht (with Gerrie Knetemann)
1983
1st Six Days of Rotterdam (with René Pijnen)
2nd Six Days of Milan (with Moreno Argentin)
2nd Six Days of Bremen (with Albert Fritz)
2nd Six Days of Antwerp (with Etienne De Wilde)

Records

Overview 
 World Record flying 500 m time trial (amateurs): 1964
 World Record 1 km time trial (amateurs): 1964
 World Record flying 1 km time trial: 1967
 World Record 1 km time trial: 1972
 World Outdoor Record flying 1 km time trial: 1973
 Most European championships wins: 15
 Most national track championships wins: 38
 Most Six Days wins: 88
 Most Six Days of Ghent wins: 11
 Most Six Days of London wins: 9

Details

World records

Six-day wins

Timeline

Partners 
• 15 events with Eddy Merckx

• 14 with Peter Post

• 10 with Albert Fritz

• 8 with René Pijnen

• 7 with Dietrich Thurau

• 3 with Klaus Bugdahl & Gert Frank

• 2 with Rudi Altig, Roger De Vlaeminck, Alain van Lancker, Julien Stevens, Graeme Gilmore, Francesco Moser & Freddy Maertens

Track Championships

Track races

Italian classics

Non-Italian classics

Stage races

Other road aces

Honours 

 Honorary Citizen of Izegem: 1996
 A velodrome, Wielerbaan Patrick Sercu in Bruges: 2007
 A velodrome, Wielerpiste Defraeye-Sercu in Roeselare: 2011
 BOIC Order of Merit: 2014
 Patrick Sercu trophy: from 2019
 A street, Patrick Sercudreef in Izegem: 2020

References

|}

1944 births
2019 deaths
People from Roeselare
Belgian male cyclists
Olympic cyclists of Belgium
Cyclists at the 1964 Summer Olympics
Belgian Tour de France stage winners
Olympic gold medalists for Belgium
Olympic medalists in cycling
Medalists at the 1964 Summer Olympics
UCI Track Cycling World Champions (men)
Sportspeople from West Flanders
Belgian track cyclists